DYVL (819 AM) Aksyon Radyo is a radio station owned and operated by Manila Broadcasting Company. Its studio, offices and transmitter are located along PNP Rd. cor. Maharlika Highway, Brgy. Campetic, Palo, Leyte.

History
DYVL was established in October 17, 1957 as a regional version of DZRH. In 1972, the station was one of the casualties of Martial Law, but went back on air after a year as Sunshine City a localized version of DWIZ. In 1978, DYVL transferred its frequency from 800 kHz to 819 kHz per GE75. In 1991, Sunshine City became Radyo Balita. In 1998, it was among the stations relaunched under MBC's regional Aksyon Radyo network.

In 2013, the station went off the air after its offices and transmitter in Brgy PHHC. Seaside, Tacloban were destroyed by Typhoon Yolanda, killing two of its reporters. In early 2014, it moved to its present home in Palo, Leyte, where it went back on the air.

References

Radio stations in Tacloban
Radio stations established in 1957